Gorgias was a Greek sophist, pre-socratic philosopher and rhetorician.

Gorgias may also refer to:
 Gorgias (dialogue), an important Socratic dialogue
 Gorgias (general) (2nd century BC), Syrian-Seleucid General
 Gorgias of Macedon (4th century BC), an officer of Alexander the Great
 Gorgias Press, an American academic publisher
 Gorgias (plural), an Angloromani version of the term Gadjo

See also
 Gorgas (disambiguation)
 Gorgasia, a genus of garden eel